Dilkusha Sporting Club, also referred as Dilkusha SC, is a Bangladeshi professional football club based in the Dilkusha area of Dhaka, Bangladesh. The club currently competes in the Dhaka Second Division Football League, the fourth-tier of Bangladeshi Football.

History
Dilkusha Sporting Club was founded in 1964, by an organiser who left Mohammedan Sporting Club. In 1968, a young Kazi Salahuddin scored 14 goals in the Dhaka Second Division League to confirm the clubs place at the 1969 edition of the Dhaka League, which was the country's top-tier at the time.

In 1974, the club achieved their highest position in the top-tier as runners-up behind Abahani Krira Chakra. However, there was controversy surrounding the champions, as in the last match of the league Dilkusha faced Abahani's arch-rivals Mohammedan, who planned to lose willingly to deny Abahani the championship. Mohammedan needed to lose by a four-goal margin to hand Dilkusha the trophy, and they were succeeding in their goal. But one of their foreign recruits, not knowing Mohammedan's intentions, scored a long-ranger. Nonetheless, Dilkusha still went on to win the match  5–1. The result meant that Dilkusha were still champions, but FIFA rules were not followed as instead of using goal difference to differentiate positions, the league used average goal scored, thus denying Dilkusha their first league trophy.

Throughout the seventies, the club produced many talented players such as, Golam Shahid Neelu who was the 1974 Dhaka League top scorer with 16 goals, while Bangladesh's leading goalscorer Ashrafuddin Ahed Chunnu also represented the club in 1973, before moving to Rahmatganj MFS.

In September 2019, Dilkusha were one of the clubs from the Motijheel area of Dhaka, who were found guilty of having an illegal casino inside of their clubhouse.

Honours
 Dhaka Second Division Football League
Champions (2): 1968, 2017–18
 Dhaka League
Runners-up (1): 1974

References

Football clubs in Bangladesh
Sport in Bangladesh
Dhaka
Association football clubs established in 1964
1964 establishments in East Pakistan